Fredonia Township is a township in Plymouth County, Iowa in the United States.

The elevation of Fredonia Township is listed as 1339 feet above mean sea level.

References

Townships in Iowa